Arnica ovata is a North American species of flowering plant in the family Asteraceae, known by the common name sticky leaf arnica. It is native to western Canada (Yukon, Alberta, British Columbia), and the western United States (Alaska, Washington, Oregon, California, Nevada, Utah, Idaho, Montana, Wyoming, Colorado).

Arnica ovata is an herb up to 50 cm (20 inches) tall. Flower heads are yellow, with both ray florets and disc florets. It grows in meadows and coniferous forests in mountainous areas.

References

External links
Paul Slichter, Arnicas East of the Cascade Mountains of Oregon and Washington, Sticky Arnica, Varied-leaved Arnica  Arnica diversifolia  photos
Calphotos Photos gallery, University of California 12 photos

ovata
Flora of Subarctic America
Plants described in 1900
Flora of Western Canada
Flora of the Northwestern United States
Flora of the Southwestern United States
Flora without expected TNC conservation status